"Henny Penny", more commonly known in the United States as "Chicken Little" and sometimes as "Chicken Licken", is a European folk tale with a moral in the form of a cumulative tale about a chicken who believes that the world is coming to an end. The phrase  features prominently in the story, and has passed into the English language as a common idiom indicating a hysterical or mistaken belief that disaster is imminent. Similar stories go back more than 25 centuries and "Henny Penny" continues to be referred to in a variety of media.

The story and its name

The story is listed as Aarne–Thompson–Uther type 20C, which includes international examples of folktales that make light of paranoia and mass hysteria.
There are several Western versions of the story, of which the best-known concerns a chick that believes the sky is falling when an acorn falls on its head. The chick decides to tell the king and, on its journey, meets other animals (mostly other fowl) which join it in the quest. After this point, there are many endings. In the most familiar, a fox invites them to its lair and then eats them all. Alternatively, the last one, usually Cocky Lockey, survives long enough to warn the chick, who escapes. In others all are rescued and finally speak to the king.

In most retellings, the animals have rhyming names, commonly Chicken Licken or Chicken Little, Henny Penny or Hen-Len, Cocky Locky, Ducky Lucky or Ducky Daddles, Drakey Lakey, Goosey Loosey or Goosey Poosey, Gander Lander, Turkey Lurkey and Foxy Loxy or Foxy Woxy.

In the United States, the most common name for the story is "Chicken Little", as attested by illustrated books for children dating from the early 19th century. In Britain and its other former colonies, it is best known as "Henny Penny" and "Chicken Licken", titles by which it also went in the United States.

History

The story was part of the oral folk tradition and only began to appear in print after the Brothers Grimm had set a European example with their collection of German tales in the early years of the 19th century. One of the earliest to collect tales from Scandinavian sources was Just Mathias Thiele, who in 1823 published an early version of the Henny Penny story in the Danish language.  The names of the characters there are Kylling Kluk, Høne Pøne, Hane Pane, And Svand, Gaase Paase, and Ræv Skræv. In Thiele's untitled account, a nut falls on Kylling Kluk's back and knocks him over. He then goes to each of the other characters, proclaiming that "I think all the world is falling" and setting them all running. The fox Ræv Skræv joins in the flight and, when they reach the wood, counts them over from behind and eats them one by one. Eventually the tale was translated into English by Benjamin Thorpe after several other versions had appeared.

Once the story began to appear in the English language, the titles by which they went varied considerably and have continued to do so. John Greene Chandler (1815-1879), an illustrator and wood engraver from Petersham, Massachusetts, published an illustrated children's book titled The Remarkable Story of Chicken Little in 1840.  In this American version of the story, the characters' names are Chicken Little, Hen-Pen, Duck-Luck, Goose-Loose, and Fox-Lox; Chicken Little is frightened by a leaf falling on her tail.

A Scots version of the tale is found in Robert Chambers's Popular Rhymes, Fireside Stories, and Amusements of Scotland of 1842.  It appeared among the "Fireside Nursery Stories" and was titled "The hen and her fellow travellers". The characters included Henny Penny, Cocky Locky, Ducky Daddles, Goosie Poosie, and an unnamed  (fox). Henny Penny became convinced that "the lifts were faun" (the heavens were falling) when a pea fell on her head.

In 1849, a "very different" English version was published under the title "The Story of Chicken-Licken" by Joseph Orchard Halliwell. In this Chicken-licken was startled when "an acorn fell on her bald " and encounters the characters Hen-len, Cock-lock, Duck-luck, Drake-lake, Goose-loose, Gander-lander, Turkey-lurkey and Fox-lox.

It was followed in 1850 by "The wonderful story of Henny Penny" in Joseph Cundall's compilation, The Treasury of pleasure books for young children. Each story there is presented as if it were a separate book, and in this case had two illustrations by Harrison Weir. In reality the story is a repetition of the Chambers narration in standard English, except that the dialect phrase "so she , and she gaed, and she gaed" is retained and the cause of panic is mistranslated as "the clouds are falling".

Benjamin Thorpe's translation of Thiele's Danish story was published in 1853 and given the title "The Little Chicken Kluk and his companions".

Comparing the different versions, we find that in the Scots and English stories the animals want "to tell the king" that the skies are falling; while in the American story, as in the Danish, they are not given any specific motivation. In all versions they are eaten by the fox, although in different circumstances.

Idiomatic usage

The name "Chicken Little" and the fable's central phrase, The sky is falling! have been applied to people accused of being unreasonably afraid, or those trying to incite an unreasonable fear in those around them.

The first use of the name "Chicken Little" to "one who warns of or predicts calamity, especially without justification" recorded by the Merriam-Webster Dictionary is in 1895, but idiomatic use of the name significantly predates that attestation. In fact, this usage is recorded in the United States very soon after the publication of Chandler's illustrated children's book in 1840.  Already, in 1842, a journal article about the Government of Haiti referred to "Chicken Little" in an offhand manner.  An "oration" delivered to the city of Boston on July 4, 1844, contains the passage:  

Fearmongering whether justified or not can sometimes elicit a societal response called Chicken Little syndrome, described as "inferring catastrophic conclusions possibly resulting in paralysis". It has also been defined as "a sense of despair or passivity which blocks the audience from actions". The term began appearing in the 1950s and the phenomenon has been noted in many different societal contexts.

Adaptations
Walt Disney Animation Studios has made two versions of the story. The first was Chicken Little, a 1943 animated short released during World War II as one of a series produced at the request of the U.S. government for the purpose of discrediting Nazism. It tells a variant of the parable in which Foxy Loxy takes the advice of a book on psychology (on the original 1943 cut, it is Mein Kampf) by striking the least intelligent first. Dim-witted Chicken Little is convinced by him that the sky is falling and whips the farmyard into mass hysteria, which the unscrupulous fox manipulates for his own benefit. The dark comedy is used as an allegory for the idea that fear-mongering weakens the war effort and costs lives. It is also one of the versions of the story in which Chicken Little appears as a character distinct from Henny Penny.

The second Disney film was the very loosely adapted Chicken Little, released in 2005 as a 3D computer-animated feature. It is an updated science fiction sequel to the original fable in which Chicken Little is partly justified in his fears. In this version, Foxy Loxy is changed from a male to a female, and from the main antagonist to a local bully. Another film adaptation was the animated TV episode "Henny Penny" (1999), which was part of the HBO series Happily Ever After: Fairy Tales for Every Child. In this modern update, the story is given a satirical and political interpretation.

There have also been a number of musical settings. American composer Vincent Persichetti used the fable as the plot of his only opera The Sibyl: A Parable of Chicken Little (Parable XX), op. 135 (1976), which premiered in 1985. In 1998, there was Joy Chaitin and Sarah Stevens-Estabrook's light-hearted musical version of the fable, "Henny Penny". Designed for between six and a hundred junior actors, it has additional characters as optional extras: Funky Monkey, Sheepy Weepy, Mama Llama, Pandy Handy and Giraffy Laughy (plus an aggressive oak tree).

In Singapore, a more involved musical was performed in 2005. This was Brian Seward's  The Acorn - the true story of Chicken Licken. It is a tale of mixed motivations as certain creatures (including some among the 'good guys') take advantage of the panic caused by Chicken Licken. In 2007 American singer and composer Gary Bachlund set the text of Margaret Free's reading version of "Chicken Little" (The Primer, 1910) for high voice and piano. In his note to the score Bachlund makes it clear that he intends a reference to alarmism and its tragic consequences.

Popular references
There are many CDs, films, novels, and songs titled "The Sky is Falling", but the majority refer to the idiomatic use of the phrase rather than to the fable from which it derives. The following are some lyrics which genuinely refer or allude to the story:

 The song "Chicken Little", from the album Fancy (1997) by the California avantrock band Idiot Flesh, contains the lyric: "The sky is falling, gotta tell the king".
 The song "Livin' on the Edge", from the album Get a Grip (1993) by Aerosmith, includes the lyrics: "If Chicken Little tells you that the sky is falling, Even if it wasn't would you still come crawling back again?"
 The song "Moving in with", from the album Bummed (1986) by the British band Happy Mondays, includes the lyrics: "Henny Penny, Cocky Locky, Goosey Loosey, Turkey Lurkey, Ducky Lucky, Chicken Little, It seems they are all on the move when the sun is falling in".
 The song "The Sky Is Falling", from Owsley's 1999 self-titled debut album, includes the lyric: "Chicken Little had a big day today".
 The song "Chicken Little Was Right", from the album The Turtles Present the Battle of the Bands (1968) by The Turtles, includes the lyrics: "Did ya hear what happened to the world today? Somebody came an' they took it away".
 In Season 6, Episode 26 of the Golden Girls, "Henny Penny — Straight, No Chaser" (May 4, 1991), Dorothy, Blanche, Rose and Sophia perform a musical of the folk tale.

Related stories
A very early example containing the basic motif and many of the elements of the tale is some 25 centuries old and appears in the Buddhist scriptures as the Daddabha Jataka (J 322). In it, the Buddha, upon hearing about some particular religious practices, comments that there is no special merit in them, but rather that they are "like the noise the hare heard." He then tells the story of a hare disturbed by a falling fruit who believes that the earth is coming to an end. The hare starts a stampede among the other animals until a lion halts them, investigates the cause of the panic and restores calm. The fable teaches the necessity for deductive reasoning and subsequent investigation.

The Australian author Ursula Dubosarsky tells the Tibetan version of the Jataka tale in rhyme, in her book The Terrible Plop (2009), which has since been dramatised, using the original title Plop!. In this version, the animal stampede is halted by a bear, rather than a lion, and the ending has been changed from the Tibetan original.

The Br'er Rabbit story, "Brother Rabbit Takes Some Exercise", is closer to the Eastern versions. In this story, Br'er Rabbit initiates the panic but does not take part in the mass flight, although Br'er Fox does. In this case it is Br'er Terrapin that leads the animals back to question Br'er Rabbit.

Notes

References

External links

 A Norwegian variant (1859) at Wikisource
  Printed between 1865–71.

English-language idioms
Metaphors referring to birds
Fictional chickens
Jataka tales
Animal tales
Fictional birds
Fictional foxes
Animals in Buddhism
Indian folklore
Indian literature
Indian fairy tales
ATU 1-99